The Merton is a high-rise development located in Kennedy Town supplying 1,182 units in total, Hong Kong. The complex consists of three towers. The entire complex, composed almost entirely of residential units, was designed by architectural firm Ronald Lu & Partners and developed by New World Development. Construction began in 1998 and completed in 2005.

The complex has a club house in each of the three towers, comprising a swimming pool, gymnasium, yoga and aerobics rooms, reading room, indoor kids playing area, steam room, and sauna.

Several scenic walks such as the Mount Davis Trail start a few minutes of walking distance from the complex. There are several bars and eateries within walking distance of The Merton. The Merton is a few minutes walk to both Cadogan Temporary Playground and Forbes Playground. The  is a 6-minute walk from the complex.

The Kennedy Town MTR station is about 5 minutes walk from the complex. The station is situated at the end of the Island line, and is 4 stations (10 minutes) away from the Central station.

Buildings of the complex

See also
List of tallest buildings in Hong Kong

References

External links
 

Buildings and structures completed in 2005
Kennedy Town
New World Development
Residential skyscrapers in Hong Kong